The Frances House is a historic house at 137 6th Street in Juneau, Alaska.  The three story wood-frame house was built in 1898 by Jerry Eicherly, then Juneau's postmaster.  In 1911 it was purchased by John Rustgard, the Alaska Territory's attorney general, and in 1927 it was rescued from demolition by Frances Davis, a noted painter of Alaskan scenes, from whom the house derives its name.  The house is a notable local example of vernacular Queen Anne styling, with a busy roofline, varied siding, and narrow Italianate windows.

The house was listed on the National Register of Historic Places in 1985.

See also
J. M. Davis House, built by Frances and J. M. Davis
National Register of Historic Places listings in Juneau, Alaska

References

1898 establishments in Alaska
Houses completed in 1898
Houses in Juneau, Alaska
Houses on the National Register of Historic Places in Alaska
Buildings and structures on the National Register of Historic Places in Juneau, Alaska
Queen Anne architecture in Alaska